Haxonite is an iron nickel carbide mineral found in iron meteorites and carbonaceous chondrites.

It was first described in 1971, and named after Howard J. Axon (1924–1992), metallurgist at the University of Manchester, Manchester, England. Co-type localities are the Toluca meteorite, Xiquipilco, Mexico and the Canyon Diablo meteorite, Meteor Crater, Coconino County, Arizona, US.

It occurs associated with kamacite, taenite, schreibersite, cohenite, pentlandite and magnetite.

See also
 Glossary of meteoritics

References

Carbide minerals
Iron minerals
Nickel minerals
Meteorite minerals
Cubic minerals
Native element minerals